Patrick Meijer (born 22 January 1973, Enschede) is a Dutch stand-up comedian from Twente, who won the Culture Comedy Award in 2005.

References

External links
Official website

1973 births
Dutch male comedians
Dutch cabaret performers
Living people
People from Enschede